Gretton may refer to:

Places
 Gretton, Gloucestershire, England
 Gretton, Northamptonshire, England
formerly main settlement of Gretton Rural District and location of Gretton railway station
 Gretton, Shropshire, England

Other uses
Gretton (surname)
Baron Gretton, a title in the Peerage of the United Kingdom